Olivier Occéan, born October 23, 1981) is a retired Canadian professional soccer player and current assistant coach of IF Urædd.

Club career

College soccer 
Occéan played college soccer at Essex County College, Newark NJ in NJCAA Division 1 and at Southern Connecticut State University for the Fighting Owls in the NCAA Division II, from 2001 to 2003.  While at the college, Occéan was twice named an NCAA All-American.  He finished his career with 57 goals, including 21 as a senior, and 22 in 2001. During this time he also played for Vermont Voltage in the USL Premier Development League.

Upon graduating from college, Occéan was selected 26th overall in the 2004 MLS SuperDraft by the MetroStars. Occéan didn't surprise many after coming from a powerhouse Division II program, which had won six NCAA titles, and looked likely to make the team. However, Occéan did surprise when, while the MetroStars were playing in the preseason La Manga Cup, Occéan impressed the Metrostars' competitors Odd Grenland so much that the team immediately offered him a contract. With Major League Soccer not willing to compete financially with the Norwegian club, Occéan ended up with Odd.

Odd 
Occéan quickly impressed in Norway, earning a starting spot and immediately scoring goals. In his first season with Odd, Occéan led the team in goals with 14, although the team slumped to a mid-table finish.

Lillestrøm SK 

He signed a five-year contract with Lillestrøm on December 10, 2005. The deal was worth approximately €885,000 plus about €126,000 in possible incentive pay. After a promising start however, his first season with the club was marred by a five-month goal-drought broken only in the very last match of the season. Occéan then faced the challenge of living up to the price tag and in the 2007 and 2008 seasons, the muscular striker bagged in 12 goals for the club.

Kickers Offenbach 
Prior to the start of the 2010–11 season, Occean moved to Germany, joining 3. Liga side Kickers Offenbach on a free transfer. He got off to a perfect start, netting four goals in his first three league appearances, thus becoming an instant favorite with Kickers fans. In his only season at the club, he scored 16 goals in 30 matches.

Greuther Fürth 
It was announced in the German media on May 25, 2011 that Occéan had signed a three-year contract with SpVgg Greuther Fürth until June 2014. Occéan made his debut for his new team on July 15 in a 3–2 home defeat to Eintracht Frankfurt. One week later, Occéan once again started for SpVgg Fürth and scored two goals leading the team to a 4–0 road victory over 1. FC Union Berlin. Occéan scored one of the most important goals of the season in the DFB-Pokal quarter finals, scoring the game winner in the 44th minute against Hoffenheim on February 8, 2012. On March 1, 2012 he was named the Canada Soccer Player of the Month for February based on his club team performances, and again for the month of March. Occéan helped lead Greuther Fürth to win the 2. Bundesliga championship. He was also awarded the league's top scorer with 17 goals in 30 appearances, Nick Proschwitz and Alexander Meier scored the same number of goals within the league, however Occéan tallied more assists.

Eintracht Frankfurt 
On July 3, 2012, Occéan transferred to Eintracht Frankfurt for €1.3 million signing a three-year contract, where he would be joining fellow Canadian Rob Friend. Occéan made his top flight debut for Frankfurt on August 25 playing all 90 minutes in a 2–1 away victory over Bayer Leverkusen. On September 15, 2012, Occéan scored his first Bundesliga goal in his third appearance for the club. He scored the second goal in an eventual 3–2 victory against Hamburger SV.

1. FC Kaiserslautern 
It was announced on July 1, 2013 that Occéan was loaned to 1. FC Kaiserslautern of the 2. Bundesliga on a two-year loan with an option for the loan to be extended even further after the 2012–13 season in which he scored only once for Frankfurt in 17 appearances.

Second spell at Odd 
On January 6, 2015, Occéan signed a half-year loan deal with his former club Odd, who plays in the Norwegian Eliteserien.
On July 8, 2015, Occéan signed a two-and-a-half-year contract with Odd.

Urædd Fotball 
In 2018, Occéan signed with Urædd Fotball of the 3. divisjon. Occéan concurrently also began his coaching career as a youth coach at Urædd.

After two seasons at Mjøndalen, he returned to Urædd Fotball for the 2020 season as a playing assistant coach. He ended his player career at the end of 2020 and continued at Urædd in his role as an assistant coach for the team and youth coach.

International career 
Occéan made his debut for Canada in a May 2004 friendly match against Wales and until the end of 2012 he has earned a total of 28 caps, scoring six goals. He has represented Canada in 15 FIFA World Cup qualification matches (four goals) and at the 2005 CONCACAF Gold Cup. He scored Canada's first and only goal from a header in a 1–0 win against Cuba in Havana, during the opening match of the semi-final round of 2014 FIFA World Cup qualification. On February 11, 2013 FIFA ruled that Occéan had committed an act of unsporting conduct, displayed several acts of unsporting behavior, and used offensive language towards match officials during a 2014 World Cup qualifying match against Cuba on October 12, 2012.  As part of the ruling, Occéan received a 6-match suspension. It was later determined that only Canada's official competitive matches, not friendlies, count toward the suspension meaning that the earliest that Occéan would be available for selection would be the final of the 2013 CONCACAF Gold Cup, if Canada were to advance that far in the tournament.

Career statistics

Club

International goals 
Scores and results list Canada's goal tally first, score column indicates score after each Occéan goal.

Honours 
Lillestrøm SK
 Norwegian Cup: 2007

Greuther Fürth
 2. Bundesliga (Promotion to the Bundesliga): 2011–12

 Individual 
 Canada Soccer Player of the Month: February 2012, March 2012
 2. Bundesliga top goalscorer: 2011–12

References

External links 
 
 
 
 

1981 births
Living people
People from Brossard
Francophone Quebec people
Black Canadian soccer players
Association football forwards
Soccer people from Quebec
Canadian soccer players
Canada men's international soccer players
2005 CONCACAF Gold Cup players
Southern Connecticut Fighting Owls men's soccer players
Vermont Voltage players
Odds BK players
Lillestrøm SK players
Kickers Offenbach players
SpVgg Greuther Fürth players
Eintracht Frankfurt players
1. FC Kaiserslautern players
Mjøndalen IF players
USL League Two players
Eliteserien players
Norwegian First Division players
Norwegian Third Division players
3. Liga players
2. Bundesliga players
Bundesliga players
Canadian sportspeople of Haitian descent
New York Red Bulls draft picks
Canadian expatriate soccer players
Canadian expatriate sportspeople in the United States
Canadian expatriate sportspeople in Norway
Canadian expatriate sportspeople in Germany
Expatriate soccer players in the United States
Expatriate footballers in Norway
Expatriate footballers in Germany